This is a bibliography of works by Argentine short-story writer, essayist, poet, and translator Jorge Luis Borges (1899–1986).

Each year links to its corresponding "[year] in literature" article (for prose) or "[year] in poetry" article (for verse).

Original book-length publications 
This list follows the chronology of original (typically Spanish-language) publication in books, based in part on the rather comprehensive (but incomplete) bibliography online at the Borges Center (originally the J. L. Borges Center for Studies & Documentation at the University of Aarhus, then at the University of Iowa, now—as of 2010—at the University of Pittsburgh). The following list focuses on book-length 
publication of original work (including collaborative work): it does not include individual short stories, poems, and translations published in magazines, nor does it include books (such as anthologies of fantasy and of Argentine literature) that Borges edited or co-edited. It also excludes several chapbooks, privately printed editions, etc. of under 50 pages each and does not attempt to identify first publication dates of individual stories, poems, etc. ISBNs refer to recent editions, not original publications. (Many English-language titles and ISBNs still missing. Some of the volumes might be better classified in terms of genre.)
 Fervor de Buenos Aires, 1923, poetry.
 Inquisiciones, 1925, essays. English title: Inquiries.
 Luna de Enfrente, 1925, poetry.
 El tamaño de mi esperanza, 1925, essays.
 El idioma de los argentinos, 1928, essays.
 Cuaderno San Martín, 1929, poetry.
 Evaristo Carriego, 1930, a tightly linked collection of essays on the Argentine poet Evaristo Carriego. An expanded edition was published in 1955, with essays on other Argentine topics.
 Discusión,  1932, essays and literary criticism. An expanded version was published in 1957.
 Historia universal de la infamia (in English: A Universal History of Infamy), 1935, short non-fictional stories and literary forgeries. The edition of 1958 adds a prologue and several more literary forgeries; 1972,. Several web sources mis-attribute this as Historia universal de la infancia (which would be A Universal History of Childhood).
 Historia de la eternidad, 1936, essays.
 El jardín de senderos que se bifurcan, 1941, short stories. English title: Garden of Forking Paths, published as a section of Ficciones.
 Seis problemas para don Isidro Parodi, 1942, comic detective fiction, written with Adolfo Bioy Casares, originally published under the name H. Bustos Domecq. English title: Six Problems for Don Isidro Parodi, 1981.
 Poemas : 1922-1943, 1943, poetry. This was a complete republication of his three previous volumes of poetry, plus some additional poems. Some of the republished poems were modified for this edition.
 Ficciones, 1944, short stories, an expanded version of El jardín de senderos que se bifurcan, 1941. The 1956 edition adds 3 stories. US title Ficciones, 1962. Also published in the UK as "Fictions" (ed. and trans. Anthony Kerrigan: Calder and Boyars, 1965), and later in a translation by Andrew Hurley.
 Un modelo para la muerte, 1946, detective fiction, written with Adolfo Bioy Casares, originally published under the name B. Suarez Lynch. The original publication was a private printing of only 300 copies. The first commercial printing was in 1970.
 Dos fantasías memorables, 1946, two fantasy stories, written with Adolfo Bioy Casares.  Like Un modelo para la muerte, the original publication was a private printing of 300 copies, with no commercial printing until 1970.
 El Aleph, 1949, essays and short stories. A slightly expanded edition was published in 1957. English title: The Aleph and Other Stories 1933-1969. The English-language edition is an incomplete translation of the Spanish-language book, but contains an autobiographical essay originally written for The New Yorker. Borges's Spanish-language Autobiografía (2000) is simply a translation of this English-language essay into Spanish.
 Aspectos de la poesía gauchesca, 1950, literary criticism.
 Antiguas literaturas germánicas, 1951, literary criticism, written with Delia Ingenieros.
 La muerte y la brújula, 1951, short stories selected from earlier published volumes.
 Otras inquisiciones 1937-1952, 1952, essays and literary criticism. English title: Other Inquisitions 1937-1952,  1964.
 Historia de la eternidad, 1953, essays, short stories, and literary criticism.
 El "Martín Fierro", 1953, essays on the epic Argentine poem Martín Fierro, written with Margarita Guerrero, .
 Poemas : 1923-1953, 1954, poetry. Essentially the same as Poemas : 1922-1943, but with the addition of a few newer poems.
 Los orilleros; El paraíso de los creyentes, 1955, 2 screenplays, written with Adolfo Bioy Casares.
 Leopoldo Lugones, 1955, literary criticism, written with Betina Edelborg.
 La hermana de Eloísa, 1955, short stories. This slim book consists of two stories by Borges, two by Luisa Mercedes Levinson, and the title story, on which they collaborated.
 Manual de zoología fantástica, 1957, short pieces about imaginary beings, written with Margarita Guerrero.
 Libro del cielo y del infierno, 1960, essays and one poem, written with Adolfo Bioy Casares. Some of this material comes from Antiguas literaturas germánicas, 1951.
 El Hacedor, 1960, poetry and short prose pieces, first published as the ninth volume in his Obras completas (Complete Works), a project which had begun in 1953. English title: Dreamtigers, 1964.
 Antología Personal, 1961, essays, poetry, literary criticism, some of it not previously published in book form. English title: A Personal Anthology, 1967.
 El lenguaje de Buenos Aires, 1963, long essays, written with José Edmundo Clemente. The 1968 edition adds several new essays by Clemente.
 Introducción a la literatura inglesa, 1965, literary criticism, written with María Esther Vázquez. 
 Para las seis cuerdas, 1965, lyrics for tangos and milongas. An expanded edition came out in 1970, but all of the poems in either edition can also be found in El otro, el mismo, 1969. Ástor Piazzolla composed the music for these tangos and milongas, the result of which was a record praised by Borges.
 Literaturas germánicas medievales, 1966, literary criticism, written with María Esther Vázquez. This is a reworking of Antiguas literaturas germánicas, 1951.
 Crónicas de Bustos Domecq, literary forgery/essays, 1967, written with Adolfo Bioy Casares. An odd book: deliberately pompous critical essays by an imaginary author. English title: Chronicles of Bustos Domecq, 1976.
 Introducción a la literatura norteamericana, 1967, literary criticism, written with Esther Zemborain de Torres. English title: An Introduction to American Literature, 1971,.
 El libro de los seres imaginarios, 1967, expansion of Manual de zoología fantástica, 1957, written with Margarita Guerrero. English title: The Book of Imaginary Beings, 1969; the English-language volume is actually a further expansion of the work.
 Conversations with Jorge Luis Borges, 1968, with Richard Burgin, originally published in English. .
 Nueva Antología Personal, 1968, essays, poetry, literary criticism, some of it not previously published in book form. This includes quite a few previously unpublished poems, and has very little intersection with Antología Personal, 1961.
 Museo, 1969?, poetry.
 Elogio de la Sombra, 1969, poetry. English title In Praise of Darkness, 1974.
 El otro, el mismo, 1969, poetry, including a complete reprint of Para las seis cuerdas, 1965.
 El informe de Brodie, short stories, 1970. English title: Dr. Brodie's Report, 1971.
 El congreso, 1971, essays.
 Nuevos Cuentos de Bustos Domecq, 1972. Borges, a Reader, 1977, written with Adolfo Bioy Casares. 
 El oro de los tigres, 1972, poetry. English title: The Gold of the Tigers, Selected Later Poems, 1977. The English-language volume also includes poems from La Rosa Profunda.
 El libro de arena, 1975, short stories, English title: The Book of Sand, 1977.
 La Rosa Profunda, 1975, poetry.
 La moneda de hierro, 1976, poetry.
 Diálogos, 1976, conversations between Borges and Ernesto Sabato, transcribed by Orlando Barone.
 Que es el budismo, 1976, lectures, written with Alicia Jurado,.
 Historia de la noche, 1977, poetry.
 Prólogos con un prólogo de prólogos, 1977, a collection of numerous book prologues Borges had written over the years.
 Borges El Memorioso, 1977, conversations with Antonio Carrizo. The title is a play on Borges's story "Funes El Memorioso", known in English as "Funes, the Memorious".
 Rosa y Azul: La rosa de Paracelso; Tigres azules, 1977, (short stories).
 Borges, oral, 1979, lectures.
 Siete noches, 1980, lectures. English title, Seven Nights.
 La cifra, 1981, poetry. English title: The Limit.
 Nueve ensayos dantescos, 1982, essays on Dante.
 Veinticinco de Agosto de 1983 y otros cuentos, 1983, short stories (also entitled La memoria de Shakespeare, English: Shakespeare's Memory)
 Atlas, 1984, stories and essays, written with María Kodama.
 Los conjurados, 1985, poetry.
 Textos cautivos, 1986, literary criticism, book reviews, short biographies of authors, translations. Edición de Enrique Sacerio-Garí y Emir Rodríguez Monegal. This book includes selected reviews, essays and notes Borges wrote in the popular Buenos Aires magazine El Hogar 1936-1939.
 This Craft of Verse, 2000, lectures, edited by Călin-Andrei Mihăilescu, a collection of six originally English-language lectures by Borges dating from 1967-1968, transcribed from recently discovered tapes..
 Professor Borges: A Course on English Literature, ed. Martín Hadis and Martin Arias (English trans. New Directions 2013), transcriptions of the twenty-five lectures Borges gave in 1966 at the University of Buenos Aires, where he taught English literature.

There are also 1953, 1974, 1984, and 1989 Obras completas (complete works) with varying degrees of completeness and a 1981 Obras completas en coloboración (complete collaborative works).

Several bibliographies also choose to include a collection of previously published essays, published in 1971 under the name Narraciones.

Some web-based lists misattribute El Caudillo, (1921 novel), to Borges. It was actually written by his father, also a Jorge Borges.

Screenplays 
 Los Orilleros (The Hoodlums) (published in Spanish 1955) (with Adolfo Bioy Casares) 
 El Paraíso de los Creyentes ("The Paradise of Believers") (published in Spanish 1955) (with Adolfo Bioy Casares) 
 Invasión, 1968, directed by Hugo Santiago.

Other works of note 
 Los mejores cuentos policiales,  1943, with Adolfo Bioy Casares. Primarily translations of English-language detective fiction, plus one originally French-language piece and some Spanish-language pieces (including Borges's own "La muerte y la brújula").
 El compadrito: su destino, sus barrios, su música 1945, anthology of Argentine writers, including articles and a prologue by Borges himself, and articles by Evaristo Carriego and Adolfo Bioy Casares. Edited with Silvina Bullrich.
 Los mejores cuentos policiales; 2da serie, 1962, with Adolfo Bioy Casares. Primarily translations of English-language detective fiction, plus one of their own Bustos Domecq stories.
 El matrero, 1970. This anthology of Argentine writers, edited by Borges, contains several pieces overtly by Borges, but also contains three short Borgesian literary forgeries, "Un hijo de Moreira", "Otra versión del Fausto", and "Las leyes del juego."
 Libro de sueños, 1976, mostly translations and paraphrases of short excerpts from world literature. Some are narrations of dreams, some are about dreams, some merely dreamlike. There are a small number of original pieces and other Spanish-language pieces as well.
 Poesía Juvenil de J.L. Borges, 1978, a collection of poems written 1919-1922, with an extensive introduction (rather longer than the poems) by Carlos Meneses.
 Textos recobrados 1919 - 1929, 1997, previously unpublished early works, both prose (in a variety of genres) and poetry.
 Textos recobrados 1931 - 1955, 2002, previously unpublished stories, essays, poems, newspaper articles, book and movie reviews, etc..

Short stories and prose poems
The translations of the titles are from Collected Fictions, translated by Andrew Hurley. The information is compiled from the Bibliografía cronológica de la obra de Jorge Luis Borges by Annick Louis and Florian Ziche. Not all of these works can be classified as short stories. For example, "The Dread Redeemer Lazarus Morell" is largely factual, but it reads like a work of fiction. Conversely, the fictional "Pierre Menard, Author of the Quixote" is written in a style resembling an essay in literary criticism.

The groupings represent books in which these were first published; they are listed by the English translation of the original Spanish-language book.

Earlier collections

Later collections

Others
 "Odín" (with Delia Ingenieros); excerpt from Antiguos literaturas germánicas (1951)

Essays 
 "Partial Magic in the Quixote", Labyrinths

English-language publication
Borges's work was first published in book form in English in 1962, with the translation and publication of Ficciones (1944) and the collection known as Labyrinths.

In 1967, Borges began a five-year period of collaboration with the American translator Norman Thomas di Giovanni, after which he became better known in the English-speaking world. Di Giovanni would continue to be his primary English-language translator from that time forward.

Translations of original collections
 Norman Thomas di Giovanni, translator, A Universal History of Infamy (1972). Translation of Historia universal de la infamia. 
 Andrew Hurley, translator, A Universal History of Iniquity (Penguin Classics, 2004). Translation of Historia universal de la infamia. 
 Anthony Kerrigan, editor, Ficciones (Grove Press, 1962), with translations by Anthony Bonner, Alastair Reid, Helen Temple, and Ruthven Todd. Published later in the UK as Fictions (Calder & Boyars, 1965). 
 Norman Thomas di Giovanni, translator, The Aleph and Other Stories 1933-1969 (E. P. Dutton, 1970). Translation of El Aleph. This English-language edition is an incomplete translation of the Spanish-language book, but contains an autobiographical essay originally written for The New Yorker. Borges's Spanish-language Autobiografía (2000) is simply a translation of this English-language essay into Spanish.
 Andrew Hurley, translator, The Aleph and Other Stories (Penguin Classics, 2004). Translation of El Aleph. 
 Ruth L.C. Simms, translator, Other Inquisitions 1937-1952 (University of Texas Press, 1975). Translation of Otras inquisiciones 1937-1952. 
 Mildred Boyer and Harold Morland, translators, Dreamtigers (University of Texas Press, 1985). Translation of El Hacedor. 
 Anthony Kerrigan, editor, A Personal Anthology (Grove Press, 1967). Translation of Antología Personal. 
 Norman Thomas di Giovanni, translator, Chronicles of Bustos Domecq (Dutton, 1976). Translation of Crónicas de Bustos Domecq. 
 L. Clark Keating and Robert O. Evans, translators, An Introduction to American Literature (University Press of Kentucky, 1971). Translation of Introducción a la literatura norteamericana. 
 Norman Thomas di Giovanni, translator, The Book of Imaginary Beings (Dutton, 1969). Translation of El libro de los seres imaginarios. The English-language volume is actually a further expansion of the work.
 Andrew Hurley, translator, The Book of Imaginary Beings (Penguin Classics, 2006). 
 Norman Thomas di Giovanni, translator, In Praise of Darkness (Dutton, 1974). Translation of Elogio de la sombra. 
 Alistair Reid, translator, The Gold of the Tigers: Selected Later Poems (1977). 
 Norman Thomas di Giovanni, translator, The Book of Sand (1977). 
 Andrew Hurley, translator, The Book of Sand and Shakespeare's Memory (Penguin Classics, 2007). 
 Eliot Weinberger, Seven Nights (New Directions, 2009). Translation of Siete noches. 
 The Limit
 Shakespeare's Memory

Collections originally in English
This is a listing of book-length English-language volumes that are reorganizations of Borges' works; translations of original collections are listed above.
 Labyrinths, 1962. This English-language anthology draws from numerous of his Spanish-language works.
 Extraordinary Tales, 1967, with Adolfo Bioy Casares..
 Selected Poems 1923-1967, a bilingual edition.
 Borges, a Reader, 1981.  
 Everything and Nothing, 1997, several stories from Ficciones combined with two lectures from Seven Nights.
 Collected Fictions, 1998. Translated by Andrew Hurley. .
 Selected Non-fictions, 1999. Edited by Eliot Weinberger. , .
 Selected Poems, 1999. Edited by Alexander Coleman. .

Book-length interviews 
 Conversations with Jorge Luis Borges, 1969, by Richard Burgin
 Borges on Writing,  1973, edited by Norman Thomas diGiovanni, Daniel Halpern, and Frank MacShane

References

 The Borges Center has two very detailed (but still incomplete) Borges bibliographies. 
 Annick Louis & Florian Ziche, "Bibliografía cronológica de la obra de Jorge Luis Borges" ("Chronological bibliography of the work of Jorge Luis Borges"). Borges Studies on Line, Borges Center. Accessed online 9 December 2008.
  Sergio Pastormerlo. "Bibliografía de los textos críticos de Borges" ("Bibliography of Borges's critical texts"). Borges Studies on Line, originally published 10 February 1999, J. L. Borges Center for Studies & Documentation. Accessed online 9 December 2008. A bibliography of criticism by Borges, and certain other of his works that Pastormerlo considers closely related to Borges' critical work. Most of these are short critical works and are not listed above.
 Borges Works. The Garden of Forking Paths has extensive notes on Borges' major works.
 The Floating Library has a complete English translation of Dreamtigers (a.k.a. El Hacedor), now freely available online in its entirety. Translated by Mildred Boyer and Harold Morland.

Bibliographies by writer
Bibliographies of Argentine writers
Bibliography
Poetry bibliographies